HMS Donegal was one of 10  armoured cruisers built for the Royal Navy in the first decade of the 20th century. She was initially assigned to the 1st Cruiser Squadron upon completion in 1903 and ran aground en route to the China Station in 1906. She was briefly placed in reserve after repairs before she was assigned to the Home Fleet in 1907. She joined the 4th Cruiser Squadron on the North America and West Indies Station in 1909 before returning home for an assignment with the Training Squadron in 1912. Donegal was reduced to reserve before World War I began in August 1914 as part of the Third Fleet

Refitting at the beginning of the war, she was then assigned to Sierra Leone for convoy protection duties as part of the 5th Cruiser Squadron. She was transferred to several different cruiser squadrons of the Grand Fleet in 1915 where she escorted convoys to Archangelsk, Russia. In mid-1916 she was assigned to convoy escort duties in the Atlantic. Donegal rejoined the 4th Cruiser Squadron on North America and West Indies Station in 1917 and continued with convoy duties until the end of the war. Donegal was sold for scrap in 1920.

Design and description
The ships were designed to displace . They were powered by two 4-cylinder triple-expansion steam engines, each driving one shaft using steam provided by 31 Belleville boilers.

The Monmouth-class ships' main armament consisted of fourteen breech-loading (BL)  Mk VII guns. Four of these guns were mounted in two twin-gun turrets, one each fore and aft of the superstructure, and the others were positioned in casemates amidships. Six of these were mounted on the main deck and were only usable in calm weather. Ten quick-firing (QF) 12-pounder 12-cwt guns were fitted for defence against torpedo boats. Donegal also carried three 3-pounder  Hotchkiss guns and two submerged 18-inch (450 mm) torpedo tubes.

Beginning in 1915, the main deck six-inch guns of the Monmouth-class ships were moved to the upper deck and given gun shields. Their casemates were plated over to improve seakeeping. The twelve-pounder guns displaced by the transfer were repositioned elsewhere. At some point in the war, a pair of three-pounder anti-aircraft guns were installed on the upper deck. 
 
The armour of the gun turrets, their barbettes and the casemates was four inches thick.

Construction and service

Donegal, named to commemorate County Donegal, was laid down by Fairfield Shipbuilding & Engineering at their Govan shipyard on 14 February 1901 and launched on 4 September 1902, when she was named by the Duchess of Abercorn, wife of the Lord-Lieutenant of County Donegal (James Hamilton, 2nd Duke of Abercorn). She was completed on 5 November 1903 and was initially assigned to the 1st Cruiser Squadron of the Channel Fleet. Whilst en route to the China Station, she ran aground at Suez, Egypt on 2 March 1906 and had to return to Chatham Dockyard for repairs. The ship was briefly placed in reserve before she was assigned to the Home Fleet in 1907. Donegal was transferred to the 4th Cruiser Squadron on the North America and West Indies Station in 1909 and collided with the merchant ship  at Gibraltar on 8 December. She returned home in 1912 for service with the Training Squadron of Home Fleet and sank the derelict merchantman  with gunfire in October 1913. The ship was assigned to the reserve Third Fleet before the beginning of World War I in August 1914.

Refitting when the war began, Donegal was assigned to the 5th Cruiser Squadron at Sierra Leone for convoy protection duties when her refit was completed. She was transferred to the 6th Cruiser Squadron of the Grand Fleet in January 1915 and then to the 7th Cruiser Squadron in November to escort convoys to Archangelsk. In March she was reassigned to the 2nd Cruiser Squadron until she was transferred to the 9th Cruiser Squadron in the mid-Atlantic for convoy escort. Donegal rejoined the 4th Cruiser Squadron on North America and West Indies Station in 1917 and continued with convoy duties until the end of the war. She was sold for scrap on 1 July 1920.

Notable commanding officers
Charles Douglas Carpendale, 1914-1915

Notes

Footnotes

Bibliography

External links
 

 

Monmouth-class cruisers
Ships built in Govan
1902 ships
World War I cruisers of the United Kingdom